Strong Arm Steady, often referred to as SAS, is a hip hop group in California's underground hip hop scene. As of December 2009, the act consists of members Phil Da Agony, Krondon, of Los Angeles, and Mitchy Slick of San Diego, California. Originally an amorphous collective of at least eight, formed as an alternative to the gang-focused productions of West Coast rap's then-dominant Death Row Records, SAS pared down to four members for recording in the studio and performing live, with Xzibit as the frontman. Since he left the group in 2006, the three remaining members have been a stable trio.

Over the years they have recorded many mixtapes and have distributed them all over the world. "Speaking directly to their fans," they were West Coast pioneers in the use of mixtapes as a group's principal method of distribution and marketing, a model necessitated by their neither being DJs nor closely affiliated with a DJ, and a method already proven on the East Coast by 50 Cent and others in the early 2000s.

Talib Kweli signed Strong Arm Steady to his Blacksmith Records label in 2007. The group released a collaboration with producer Madlib, In Search of Stoney Jackson, with a roster of guest vocalists including studio head Talib Kweli, former SAS member Planet Asia, Guilty Simpson, Phonte (of Little Brother), Fashawn, and "a host of underground Los Angeles's emerging rap talent." Stoney Jackson, as it has been called for short, was released online as MP3 files in December 2009 through Stones Throw Records, with a CD release date of January 26, 2010. The album was named one of the best albums of 2010 by numerous media outlets including AllHipHop and on the blog of famed producer DJ Premier.

Their album Arms & Hammers was released on February 22, 2011 by Blacksmith Records and Element 9 and distributed by Fontana Distribution.

Discography

Albums & EPs
2007: Deep Hearted
2010: In Search of Stoney Jackson
2011:  Arms & Hammers
2012: Members Only EP
2012: Stereo Type (with Statik Selektah)
2012: Stereo Jr (EP) (with Oh No)

Official mixtapes 
2003: The Collectors Edition Vol.1: The Best of Mixtapes, Exclusives & Freestyles
2003: D-Bo Series Vol.1
2003: D-Bo Series Vol.2
2003: Gangs of L.A.
2004: L.A. Ballin' 2004: All-Star Edition
2006: O-Dog Series Vol.1
2006: Green Up
2006: Strong Arm Radio: Klack Music - Blacksmith Edition
2007: Dilated Steady: 20:20 Official Mixtape (with Dilated Peoples)
2008: Deep Hearted: The Sampler Mixtape
2008: Cali Untouchable Radio 17: Klak Klak Edition
2009: Gang Mentality
2013: 2 Many Other Niggas to Name

Singles 
 One Step (2007)
 Can't Let It Go (2010)
 Trunk Music (2010)
 Make Me Feel (2011)
 On Point feat. Too Short (2011)
 Hand Guns feat. Jelly-Roll (2011)

References

Hip hop groups from California
Stones Throw Records artists
American musical trios